Woo Hye-rim (born September 1, 1992), known professionally as Hyerim or Lim, is a South Korean singer, rapper, and songwriter known for her work as a former member of South Korean girl group Wonder Girls.

Early life 
Woo Hye-rim was born on September 1, 1992, in Seoul, South Korea. She was a Hong Kong resident for 14 years. She can speak Korean, English, Cantonese, and Mandarin fluently. Her father is a grandmaster and promoter of Taekwondo, with the highest 9th-degree black belt in the discipline.

Career

Pre-debut 
Originally, Woo was a part of five-member group in training in 2009. While still in training, the group flew to China where they appeared in numerous variety shows performing dance routines and songs to showcase their talent to the Chinese audience. As the group had no official name they were widely known to the Chinese audiences as "JYP Sisters" or simply as "Sisters". They were also dubbed by JYPE as the "Chinese Wonder Girls". However, before the group could officially debut, two of their members withdrew leaving only three which included Lim herself as well as Jia and Fei, who both went onto become members of Miss A.

Wonder Girls and other activities 

On January 22, 2010, she was pulled from what would be Miss A and announced to be joining the Wonder Girls, after member Sunmi put her musical career on hiatus to focus on studies.
 Her official debut stage with the group  was on February 5, 2010, in a performance in Shanghai.

In 2013, she became a co-host for EBS radio broadcast English Go Go!. From August 20, 2013 to March 10, 2014, she also served as the host of Arirang TV's Pops in Seoul.

On June 24, 2015, it was announced that Wonder Girls would be making comeback after two-year hiatus, as a four-member band. On the band's August 2015 release REBOOT, Woo contributed to the writing and production of three songs.

Hyerim released a collaboration single with Bernard Park titled "With You" on April 3, 2016, as a part of JYP Entertainment's JYP Duet Match project. In July of the same year, Lim contributed to the composition of two songs on Wonder Girls' single EP Why So Lonely.

On January 26, 2017, it was announced that Wonder Girls were to disband after unsuccessful contract renewal negotiation with some of its members. Hyerim was one of the members who renewed her contract with JYP Entertainment. The group released their final single "Draw Me" on February 10; it also serves as a celebration for their 10th anniversary since debut.

Hyerim left JYP Entertainment on January 25, 2020, and her departure from the label was announced three days later.

On March 10, 2020, Hyerim signed with RRR Entertainment, a new agency founded by fellow Wonder Girls member Yubin since she left JYP Entertainment.In February 2023, the agency announced that Hyerim has decided not to renew the contract.

Personal life
In 2017, Hyerim began majoring in Interpretation in Hankuk University of Foreign Studies, under the school's Department of English for International Conferences and Communication (EICC). She was accepted into the program in December 2016 and received a scholarship in her first semester. In February 2018, she was honored with a certificate from the Ministry of Foreign Affairs for creating a voluntary video on safety in traveling overseas. She helped translate The Diary of a Young Girl by Anne Frank from English to Korean for its publication in South Korea. Woo graduated from Hankuk in 2021.

Hyerim began dating taekwondo athlete Shin Min-chul in 2013. They were confirmed to be engaged in May 2020 and got married on July 5.

On October 8, 2021, Hyerim announced she was expecting for her first child with Shin.  On February 25, 2022, Woo's agency confirmed that she gave birth to her first son on February 23, 2022.

Discography

Singles

Songwriting and composing credits

Filmography

Film

Television shows

Hosting

Ambassadorship 
 publicity ambassador for Gachibom Film Festival  (2021)

Awards and nominations

References

External links 

 Hyerim's Official Twitter

1992 births
Living people
Wonder Girls members
JYP Entertainment artists
English-language singers from South Korea
Japanese-language singers of South Korea
Mandarin-language singers of South Korea
South Korean female idols
South Korean female models
South Korean women pop singers
South Korean television personalities
South Korean expatriates in Hong Kong
Danyang U clan
Hankuk University of Foreign Studies alumni